Marianna Shirinyan (born 25 September 1978) is an Armenian-Danish musician and prizewinner of various musical contests. A Steinway Artist.

Biography
Marianna Shirinyan was born in Yerevan, Armenia on 25 September 1978.  Marianna Shirinyan is one of the most creative and sought after soloists and chamber musicians on stage today. She is a frequent guest at a string of international festivals, among them the Schleswig-Holstein Music Festival, the Schwetzinger Festspiele, MDR Summer Music Festival,  Festspillene in Bergen, as well as  Stavanger, Risør, Oxford International Chamber Music Festivals  a.o.
Simultaneously she has won the reputation of being one of this generations leading pianists through solo appearances with such leading orchestras as the Danish National Symphony Orchestra, Oslo, Helsinki and Copenhagen Philharmonic Orchestras, Tapiola Sinfonietta, Göteborg and Norrköping Symphony Orchestras in Sweden as well as Odense, Århus and South Jutland Symphony Orchestras in Denmark. During the season 2013-14 Marianna was Artist in residence at the Odense Symphony Orchestra.

Outside Scandinavia, she has performed with the Bavarian Radio Symphony Orchestra, the Potsdamer Kammerakademie, the Deutsche Radio Philharmonie Saarbrücken Kaiserslautern, the Munich Symphony Orchestra, Würzburg Philharmonic, Munich and Hamburg Chamber Orchestras the Armenian Philharmonic Orchestra, I Pomeriggi Musicali di Milano, Wuhan Philharmonic under the baton of such conductors as Hans Graf, Lawrence Foster, Zoltan Kocsis, Antonello Manacorda, Jun Märkl, Daniel Raiskin,  Lan Shui,  Marc Soustrot, Thomas Søndergård, Krysztof Urbanski and Joshua Weilerstein.

Performances 
Shirinyan managed to perform in several cities of Denmark, Finland, Netherlands, Germany, Italy, Armenia, Russia and other places. Specifically outside Scandinavia, she has performed with the Bavarian Radio Symphony Orchestra, the Potsdamer Kammerakademie, the Deutsche Radio Philharmonie Saarbrücken Kaiserslautern, the Munich Symphony Orchestra, Würzburg Philharmonic, Hof Symphony Orchestra, Munich Chamber Orchestra, the Armenian Philharmonic Orchestra, and I Pomeriggi Musicali di Milano. In addition, she has worked with known conductors such as Zoltán Kocsis, Simon Gaudenz, Antonello Manacorda, Thomas Søndergård, Krysztof Urbanski, and Joshua Weilerstein.

In February 2013, Shirinyan made her Rachmaninov performance with the Danish Radio Symphony Orchestra.

Teaching career
In the period between 1998 and 2006, she held a part-time position as a teacher/coach of piano accompaniment at the Musikhochschule Lübeck in Germany, she entered the position with tender age of 19. Between 1999-2003 Marianna returned regularly to the Orchestra Academy of the Schleswig Holstein Music festival as a coach for piano/chamber music. 
In addition from 2003-2011 she has been a regular member of the Esbjerg Ensemble in Denmark. Marianna has been teaching at the chamber music summer academy of the  competition 'Jugend Musiziert' in Schloss Weikersheim, Germany as a youngest ever docent of the academy.

Since 2015 Marianna is Professor at the Norwegian Academy of Music in Oslo.

Repertoire

Achievements
The following is the list of Shirinyan's accomplishments:

During her early years, she placed 1st in the Youth Chamber Music Competition in Paderborn, Germany (Junge Ensembles Musizieren) in 1994. She was also a prizewinner in the International Competition for Young Pianists in Ettlingen, Germany, Gaillard, France, and twice in Spain - Maria Canals and C.I.P.C.E.
In 2001, Marianna Shirinyan received the prize in both the Schleswig-Holstein Musik Festival and the Possehl Music Award in Lübeck. 
In 2002, she won 1st Prize in the International Lion's Competition. Soon after, she had received more accomplishments. 
She had won 1st place once again while playing together with Finnish violinist Laura Vikman in the Premio Vittorio Gui chamber music competition in Florence, Italy in 2004. 
She received five awards in the ARD International Music Competition held in Munich, namely the Second Prize, the Audience Prize, the Special Prize of Münchner Kammerorchester, the Brüder-Busch Prize, and the Prize of Symphonieorchester des Bayerischen Rundfunks.
In 2009, The Association of Danish Music Critics awarded Shirinyan their Annual Prize. 
In 2010, she received the Danish Radio's P2 Artist Prize for her contributions to the musical and artistic life in Denmark.
During 2014 Marianna Shirinyan was jury member at two significant International Piano competitions, the ARD Music Competition in Munich and the Edvard Grieg International piano competition in Bergen/Norway. 
In 2016 she returned to the Grieg competition as a jury member. 
During the years 2016/17 Marianna was Artistic director of the Fejø Chamber music festival.  
In 2018 Marianan Shirinyan will take over the artistic direction of the Oremandsgaard Kammermusikfest in Denmark.

Discography
Marianna has a bright discography included the solo recital “Il Viaggio”(Solo musica), Beethoven No1/ Kuhlau piano concertos together with Copenhagen Philharmonic (Orchid Classics) Mozart Piano Concertos no 12&23 with Odense Symphony Orchestra (Bridgerecords), Chopin Chamber music together with Andreas Brantelid, cello and Vilde Frang violin (EMI). Recently Marianna released a cd with works by Niels W Gade dedicated to composers 200 years Jubilee (Dacapo), Marianna's latest release is a chamber music CD together with the young Norwegian violinist Guro Kleven Hagen (Simax). All the CD's has been received enthusiastically by international reviewers and listeners alike.

References

External links 

Official The International Edvard Grieg Piano competition
Hamburger Camerata
KUHLAU / BEETHOVEN Piano Concertos 
KUHLAU / BEETHOVEN Piano Concertos - Classical Reviews 

1978 births
Living people
Musicians from Yerevan
Armenian classical pianists
Armenian women pianists
21st-century classical pianists
Danish classical pianists
Women classical pianists